Erlin Township is an urban township in Changhua County, Taiwan.

Geography
With an area of 92.8578 square kilometers, it is the largest township in Changhua County. As of January 2023, its population was 48,379, including 24,774 males and 23,605 females.

History
During the Dutch period, the area was under the administrative region of Favorlang (modern-day Huwei, Yunlin). Present-day Erlin was probably at or near Gierim, "one of the primary centers for Sino-aboriginal trade and a favorite haunt of pirates and smugglers."

Administrative divisions
Fengtian, Donghe, Nanguang, Xiping, Beiping, Zhongxi, Guangxing, Xiangtian, Waizhu, Xinghua, Dongxing, Houcuo, Dingcuo, Zhaojia, Zhenxing, Wanxing, Yongxing, Xizhuang, Meifang, Hualun, Wange, Dongshi, Dayong, Yuandou, Xidou, Donghua and Fufeng Village.

Tourist attractions
 Renhe Temple

Transportation

Bus station in the township is Erlin Bus Station of Yuanlin Bus.

Notable natives
 Liu Wen-hsiung, Member of the Legislative Yuan (1990)
 Liao Yung-lai, Member of the Legislative Yuan (1993–1996), Taichung County magistrate (1997–2001)

References

External links

 

Townships in Changhua County
Taiwan placenames originating from Formosan languages